Pau dos Ferros is a microregion in the Brazilian state of Rio Grande do Norte.

Municipalities 
The microregion consists of the following municipalities:
Alexandria
Francisco Dantas
Itaú
José da Penha
Marcelino Vieira
Paraná
Pau dos Ferros
Pilões
Portalegre
Rafael Fernandes
Riacho da Cruz
Rodolfo Fernandes
São Francisco do Oeste
Severiano Melo
Taboleiro Grande
Tenente Ananias
Viçosa

References

Microregions of Rio Grande do Norte